Francis I (in Breton Fransez I, in French François I) (11 May 1414 – 17 July 1450), was Duke of Brittany, Count of Montfort and titular Earl of Richmond, from 29 August 1442 to his death. He was born in Vannes, the son of John V, Duke of Brittany and Joan of France, the daughter of King Charles VI of France.

Family
Francis I was originally engaged to Bonne of Savoy, the daughter of Amadeus VIII, Duke of Savoy, and his wife Mary of Burgundy. She died just before their marriage in 1430, at the age of 15.

Francis I's first marriage was to Yolande of Anjou, daughter of Louis II, Duke of Anjou and Yolande of Aragon; they were married in Nantes in August 1431. Francis and Yolande had a son, Renaud, Count of Montfort. His son Renaud died young and his wife Yolande died in 1440.

His second marriage was to Isabel of Scotland (daughter of James I, King of Scots and Joan Beaufort); he married Isabel at the Château d'Auray on 30 October 1442. Francis and Isabel had two daughters:
 Margaret of Brittany (1443–1469, Nantes), married Francis II, Duke of Brittany.
 Marie of Brittany (1444–1506), married John II, Viscount of Rohan and Count of Porhoët.

Succession
Francis I died on 17 July 1450 at the Château de l'Hermine, being only 36 years of age. Because he had no surviving male heirs at the time of his death, he was succeeded as Duke of Brittany by his younger brother, Peter II of Brittany.

During his time, the residences of the Dukes of Brittany consisted of: the Château de l'Hermine; the Château de Nantes; the Château de Clisson; and the Château de Suscinio.

Ancestry

See also
Dukes of Brittany family tree

References

Brittany, Francis I, Duke of
Brittany, Francis I, Duke of
15th-century dukes of Brittany
15th-century peers of France
Dukes of Brittany
House of Dreux
Montfort of Brittany